Zakir Dilyaverovich Dzhalilov (born July 30, 1972) is a Kyrgyz former footballer. He is the current goalkeeping coach of Kyrgyzstan.

Career 
Dzhalilov played for many team in his native Kyrgyzstan, as well as for Yelimay and Shakhter Karagandy in Kazakhstan and Tampines Rovers in Singapore.

Personal 
His son Raul is also a footballer who plays for Bolat in the Kazakhstan First Division.

Career statistics

International

References 

1972 births
Living people
Kyrgyzstan international footballers
Kyrgyzstani footballers
FC Abdysh-Ata Kant players
FC Alga Bishkek players
FC Dordoi Bishkek players
Kyrgyzstani expatriate footballers
Expatriate footballers in Russia
Expatriate footballers in Kazakhstan
Expatriate footballers in Singapore
Association football goalkeepers
Place of birth missing (living people)
FC Lokomotiv Nizhny Novgorod players
Kyrgyzstani expatriate sportspeople in Kazakhstan
Kyrgyzstani expatriate sportspeople in Singapore
Kyrgyzstani expatriate sportspeople in Russia